The Roman Catholic Diocese of Morombe (Latin: Moromben(sis)) is a diocese located in the Ecclesiastical province of Toliara in Madagascar. The episcopal see is in the city of Morombe.

History
On April 25, 1960, Pope John XXIII established the Diocese of Morombe by partitioning the Diocese of Morondava. The new diocese contained the districts of Manja, Beroroha, Morombe, and Ankazoabo. Joseph Zimmermann, M.S.F., was the first bishop. , the diocese included 200 primary schools, seven secondary schools, and seven missionary hospitals.

Leadership
 Bishops of Morombe (Roman rite)
 Bishop Joseph Zimmermann, M.S.F. (28 May 1960 – 4 December 1988)
 Bishop Alwin Albert Hafner, M.S.F. (15 May 1989 – 15 July 2000)
 Bishop Zygmunt Robaszkiewicz, M.S.F. (24 April 2001 – 19 November 2022)

See also
Roman Catholicism in Madagascar

References

External links
 GCatholic.org
 Catholic Hierarchy

Roman Catholic dioceses in Madagascar
Christian organizations established in 1960
Roman Catholic dioceses and prelatures established in the 20th century
1960 establishments in Madagascar
Roman Catholic Ecclesiastical Province of Toliara